Leonard Walter Brockington  (6 April 1888 – 15 September 1966) was a Canadian lawyer, civil servant, public figure, and the first head of the Canadian Broadcasting Corporation (CBC).

Born in Cardiff, Wales, one of seven children,  Brockington was educated at the University of Wales, graduating with honours in Latin and Greek. He arrived in Canada in 1912. Settling in Edmonton, Brockington became a journalist and civil servant. He studied law at the University of Alberta and became a solicitor for the city of Calgary. He then joined the Calgary law firm of James Lougheed and R. B. Bennett.

He served as Chairman of the Board of Governors of the CBC from 1936 to 1939. He also served as:

 Special Assistant to Prime Minister Mackenzie King from 1939 to 1942
 Narrator of the introduction to Humphrey Jennings Listen to Britain 
 Joined the law firm Gowling, MacTavish, Osborne and Henderson in 1942 as Counsel
 Adviser on Commonwealth Affairs to the British Ministry of Information from 1942 to 1943
 A member of the Canada Council
 Wrote an informative chapter on Baron Tweedsmuir [John Buchan] Governor General of Canada in "John Buchan by his Wife and Friends"
 Rector of Queen's University from 1947 to 1966

An annual Visitorship was established at Queen's in 1968, to honour the memory of Brockington, with the help of funding from the Samuel McLaughlin Foundation. The Visitorship brings "a person of international distinction" to come to Queen's to deliver a public lecture, and to meet formally and informally with faculty, students, and community members.

Queen's has also named Brockington House, a student residence, in his memory. In 1946, he was made a Companion of the Order of St Michael and St George.

References

External links

Leonard Walter Brockington fonds at Queen’s University Archives
Leonard Walter Brockington at The Canadian Encyclopedia
 LW Brockington

1888 births
1966 deaths
Lawyers in Alberta
Alumni of the University of Wales
20th-century Canadian civil servants
Canadian Companions of the Order of St Michael and St George
Canadian King's Counsel
Journalists from Cardiff
Presidents of the Canadian Broadcasting Corporation
University of Alberta alumni
British emigrants to Canada
Place of death missing